The L Line (formerly the Gold Line before 2020) is a  light rail line running from Azusa to East Los Angeles via Downtown Los Angeles serving several attractions, including Little Tokyo, Union Station, the Southwest Museum, Chinatown, and the shops of Old Pasadena. The line, one of seven in the Los Angeles Metro Rail system, entered service in 2003 and is operated by the Los Angeles County Metropolitan Transportation Authority (Metro). The L Line serves 26 stations (including two underground stations).

In October 2020, the line was broken into two disconnected segments with the closure of the Little Tokyo/Arts District station in preparation for the opening of the Regional Connector tunnel in Spring 2023. At that point, the L Line will cease to exist as a distinct line within the system, with the northern half serving as an extension to the A Line and the southern half serving as an extension to the E Line. Bus shuttles currently connect the two portions of the line.

Service description

Route description 

Beginning in East Los Angeles, the L Line initially runs west toward Downtown Los Angeles. From its southern terminus at Atlantic, the line travels west along 3rd Street to Indiana Street, where it turns north for two blocks to 1st Street. From here, the line continues west to Little Tokyo, partly through a tunnel under Boyle Heights with two underground stations. The southern part of the line currently stops at Pico/Aliso station because of Regional Connector construction. At Union Station, riders can connect to the northern segment on the L Line to Azusa. Transfers include the Metro B and Metro D subway lines, the Metro J bus rapid transit line, as well as several other transit bus lines, Metrolink regional commuter trains and Amtrak services, including the Pacific Surfliner regional route and long-distance interstate trains.

From Union Station, the L Line proceeds north on an elevated viaduct to Chinatown and then crosses the Los Angeles River adjacent to the Golden State Freeway (Interstate 5). From here, the route continues north/northeast, serving the hillside communities north of downtown, including Lincoln Heights, Mount Washington (Southwest Museum), and Highland Park. Through this stretch, the L Line operates primarily at grade, except for a short underpass below Figueroa Street. At Highland Park (50 Ave), the train runs in the median of Marmion Way, where trains run only .

North of Highland Park, the route crosses over the Arroyo Seco Parkway (State Route 110) via the grand Santa Fe Arroyo Seco Railroad Bridge. The route continues through South Pasadena and then downtown Pasadena, primarily at grade. In Old Pasadena, the line travels underground for almost half a mile long, passing under Pasadena's main thoroughfare, Colorado Boulevard. ( station, just north of Colorado Boulevard, is below grade.) Then, the L Line enters the median of the Foothill Freeway (Interstate 210) and continues east to  station in Pasadena just west of the Arcadia city limits.

East of Pasadena, the route crosses over the eastbound lanes of Interstate 210 west of Santa Anita Avenue on the art-inspired Gold Line Bridge, with a stop at the Arcadia Station, located at the corner of First Avenue and Santa Clara Street. The train then crosses over Huntington Drive and stops at the Monrovia Station, north of Duarte Road at Myrtle Avenue. It continues eastbound with a stop at the Duarte/City of Hope Station located at the north side of Duarte Road, across from the City of Hope Medical Center, then continues going over the San Gabriel River and stops at the Irwindale Station at Irwindale Avenue. Trains zoom over the Foothill Freeway, over Foothill Boulevard, and stop at the Downtown Azusa Station at Azusa Avenue, north of Foothill Boulevard. Its terminus is at the APU/Citrus College Station just west of Citrus Avenue.

Hours and frequency

Speed 
The L Line is particularly slow through the Highland Park area, where trains reach speeds of only  while operating in a street running section on Marmion Way.

Station listing 
The following table lists the current stations of the L Line, from south to north.

Ridership 
Following the extension to East Los Angeles in 2009, the line's ridership increased to almost 30,000 daily boardings. , the average weekday daily boardings for the L Line stood at 42,417, and  the average daily weekday boardings had increased to 44,707. Following the extension to Azusa, ridership rose to 49,238 as of May 2016.

History 

Much of the L Line's right-of-way through the San Gabriel Valley was built by the Los Angeles and San Gabriel Valley Railroad in 1885, eventually taken over by the Atchison, Topeka and Santa Fe Railway, as part of the Pasadena Subdivision, which saw Amtrak service until 1994, when construction began on the conversion to light rail. The project was originally called the "Pasadena Metro Blue Line," and planners envisioned extending the existing Blue Line from Long Beach, but when a ban on sales tax spending on subway tunnels passed in 1998, the project became a separate line terminating at Union Station.

The now-renamed Gold Line, between Union Station and Sierra Madre Villa station in East Pasadena, opened on July 26, 2003.

Following a new right-of-way, the Gold Line Eastside Extension extended the line east between Union Station and East Los Angeles, opened on November 15, 2009.

Phase 2A (the section between LA and Pasadena was Phase 1) of the Gold Line Foothill Extension, running between Sierra Madre Villa station and APU/Citrus College station in Azusa, opened on March 5, 2016.

Future developments

Regional Connector Transit Project 

Metro is currently constructing the Regional Connector, a light rail subway tunnel across Downtown Los Angeles that will connect the A, E, and L Lines. The project will finally complete the late 1990s vision of the "Pasadena Blue Line," connecting the northern (Union Station–Azusa) segment of the L Line to the A Line (formerly the Blue Line), which runs between Los Angeles and Long Beach. The southern (Pico/Aliso–East LA) segment will be combined with the current E Line, which runs between Los Angeles and Santa Monica. The new east–west line will keep the E Line name but use the L Line's gold color icon.

The groundbreaking for constructing the Regional Connector took place on September 30, 2014, and is expected to be in service by 2023.

Foothill Extension 

Phase 2B of the Foothill Extension, running between APU/Citrus College station in Azusa and the Pomona–North Metrolink station in Pomona, is currently under construction, with a current estimated completion date of 2026. This extension, like the original Gold Line to Pasadena, and the first phase of the Foothill Extension is being built by a specialized construction authority, independent of Metro. The original plan called for the extension to end at Montclair in San Bernardino County, but budget challenges forced the construction authority to cut the line back to Pomona.

When this project is completed, it will be served by the A Line.

Eastside Transit Corridor 

Metro is planning an extension of the L Line's southern leg eastward from its current terminus at Atlantic station. The proposed line would travel south on Garfield Avenue to the Citadel Outlets in Commerce, then turn east on Washington Boulevard making stops in Montebello, Pico Rivera, Santa Fe Springs and Whittier. The project is currently under environmental review, with a forecasted opening in 2035.

Operations

Maintenance facilities 
The L Line fleet is stored and maintained and is operated at Division 21 and Division 24. Division 21 is located on Vin Scully Drive (Elysian Park Drive) just north of North Broadway, overlooking the Los Angeles River, and Division 24 is located south of the I-210 freeway in Monrovia.

Rolling stock 

L Line trains are typically two-car trains off-peak. During peak hours on weekdays, some three-car trains run. On New Year's Day, the L Line uses three-car trains for service to the Tournament of Roses Parade and the Rose Bowl Game.

Like the A, C, E, and K lines, trains are composed of high-floor articulated light rail vehicles (LRVs), currently either the AnsaldoBreda P2550 which solely operate on the L line, or the Kinki Sharyo P3010which operate on all lines. The line initially operated with Siemens P2000 LRVs that originally ran on the A and C lines, but they were transferred to the A Line and E Line in April 2012. Once the Regional Connector opens, Metro's entire LRV fleet will be used on the line.

Incidents 
The following noteworthy incidents have occurred on the L Line since opening.

 September 11, 2007 – A driver was critically injured and six passengers, including an LA County Deputy Sheriff and the train operator, suffered minor injuries when a pickup truck ran a red light at Avenue 55 and Marmion Way before being hit by a train.
 September 21, 2007 – Six people suffered non-life-threatening injuries, including two minor injuries, after an SUV broke off the crossing arms and was struck by a northbound train (car 243) at Avenue 50 and Marmion Way in Mt. Washington. The vehicle caught fire, and a train section was also burnt. It was claimed that the female SUV driver had tried to beat the train. A resident extinguished the fire in the car with a garden hose before Los Angeles Fire arrived. The train that suffered fire damage was repaired and later placed on the Metro C Line.
 October 13, 2007 – Service was suspended for 12 hours after a big rig hit the center divider of the eastbound Foothill Freeway at Sierra Madre Boulevard and went on the tracks.
August 26, 2011 – An altercation between passengers resulted in a non-fatal stabbing during a trip through Pasadena. The train was stopped at Memorial Park station, where the victim was transported to a hospital, and the suspect was detained.
April 24, 2014 – Service was suspended between the Lake and Sierra Madre Villa stations after a collision between two tractor-trailers on the eastbound Foothill Freeway resulted in one vehicle landing on the line, damaging the rails and overhead wires. Full return to normal service took several days.
March 6, 2016 – Service between Allen and Arcadia stations was disrupted for most of the evening, resuming Monday morning, one day after the opening of the Foothill Extension when a semi-truck driver lost control and sent his trailer onto the tracks.
February 20, 2018 – A high-speed pursuit ended when the pursuit suspect drove into the tunnel between Soto and Indiana stations, suspending service.
April 26, 2018 – An accident on the Foothill Freeway sent a FedEx truck onto the tracks between Lake and Memorial Park stations, damaging the rails and overhead wires.
November 27, 2018 – A man was fatally stabbed near the Azusa station.
May 7, 2022 – A man was sprayed with a flammable liquid before being lit on fire at Lake Station. The man was seriously injured, but survived.

See also 
Los Angeles and San Gabriel Valley Railroad

References

External links 

 Gold Line Eastside Extension website
 Gold Line schedule
 Metro Gold Line Foothill Extension Construction Authority

 
Light rail in California
Public transportation in Los Angeles
Public transportation in Los Angeles County, California
Gold
Gold
Gold Line
Gold Line
Gold
Gold
Gold
Railway lines in highway medians
750 V DC railway electrification